Dencho Denev (born 22 August 1936) is a Bulgarian former sports shooter. He competed at five Olympic Games between 1960 and 1976.

See also
 List of athletes with the most appearances at Olympic Games

References

1936 births
Living people
Bulgarian male sport shooters
Olympic shooters of Bulgaria
Shooters at the 1960 Summer Olympics
Shooters at the 1964 Summer Olympics
Shooters at the 1968 Summer Olympics
Shooters at the 1972 Summer Olympics
Shooters at the 1976 Summer Olympics
People from Karnobat
20th-century Bulgarian people